Sodder is a settlement in the Essoyla rural settlement (сельское поселение) of Pryazhinsky District, Republic of Karelia, Russia. The population in 1.1.2013 was 188. The distance to Pryazha is 78 km.

Geography 
Sodder is located on the Shuya river, near the western shore of lake Shotozero.

History 
Sodder was established in May 1949. It is named after the ducks living in the area, likely through the Livvi word sotku referring to various species of duck. It was the center of a rural administration including Kamennavolok, Novye Peski and Ulyalega until the 20th of January 2003.

Economy 
Sodder's economy is based on forestry.

Sights 
There is a grave for Soviet pilots who died during the Second World War.

A "village day" has been celebrated on the 19th of August.

References 

Rural localities in the Republic of Karelia
Pryazhinsky District